The Hauraki Plains are a geographical feature and non-administrative area (though Hauraki Plains County Council existed from 1920 to 1989 and a statistical Area Unit remains) located in the northern North Island of New Zealand, at the lower (northern) end of the Thames Valley. They are located 75 kilometres south-east of Auckland, at the foot of the Coromandel Peninsula and occupy the southern portion of a rift valley bounded on the north-west by the Hunua Ranges, to the east by the Coromandel and Kaimai ranges and the west by a series of undulating hills which separate the plains from the much larger plains of the Waikato River. Broadly, the northern and southern parts of the Hauraki Plains are administered by the Hauraki District and the Matamata-Piako District respectively.

The alluvial plains have been built up by sediment deposited by the Piako and Waihou rivers, which flow north to reach the sea at the Firth of Thames, and earlier by the ancestral Waikato River. The resulting land is flat, peat-heavy, and partly swampy which has been converted into excellent land for dairy farming.

Economically, the dairy farming is the leading primary industry, supported by other grassland farming. More recently, tourism in the Hauraki Plains region has been growing and the Hauraki Rail Trail, part of the New Zealand Cycle Trail, has been constructed in the Hauraki Plains.

The largest town fully within the Plains is Ngatea, with a smaller settlement of Turua. The larger town of Paeroa is located on the eastern edge of the Hauraki Plains. While there is no defined geographical southern boundary to the Hauraki Plains, this is generally taken as being a line between the towns of Te Aroha and Morrinsville, approximately following State Highway 26.

Demographics 
Three statistical areas cover the northern part of Hauraki Plains: Hauraki Plains North, Hauraki Plains East and Hauraki Plains South. They include Turua, Kaihere, Kerepehi, Pipiroa and Waitakaruru, and surround but do not include Ngatea.

These three statistical areas had a population of 4,053 at the 2018 New Zealand census, an increase of 243 people (6.4%) since the 2013 census, and an increase of 90 people (2.3%) since the 2006 census. There were 1,479 households, comprising 2,067 males and 1,986 females, giving a sex ratio of 1.04 males per female, with 927 people (22.9%) aged under 15 years, 720 (17.8%) aged 15 to 29, 1,848 (45.6%) aged 30 to 64, and 561 (13.8%) aged 65 or older.

Ethnicities were 86.6% European/Pākehā, 20.2% Māori, 2.5% Pacific peoples, 3.4% Asian, and 1.9% other ethnicities. People may identify with more than one ethnicity.

The percentage of people born overseas was 10.8, compared with 27.1% nationally.

Although some people chose not to answer the census's question about religious affiliation, 59.5% had no religion, 26.6% were Christian, 1.9% had Māori religious beliefs, 0.2% were Hindu, 0.3% were Buddhist and 2.2% had other religions.

Of those at least 15 years old, 315 (10.1%) people had a bachelor's or higher degree, and 807 (25.8%) people had no formal qualifications. 417 people (13.3%) earned over $70,000 compared to 17.2% nationally. The employment status of those at least 15 was that 1,638 (52.4%) people were employed full-time, 510 (16.3%) were part-time, and 87 (2.8%) were unemployed.

History

Formation
Around 2–3 million years ago, a large block of the crust slumped down 500–2000 metres, forming the Hauraki graben. The ancestral Waikato River often flowed through the resulting valley into the Hauraki Gulf, most recently through the Hinuera Valley some 20,000 years ago. Over time, the Hauraki Basin slowly filled up with pumice, mud and gravel.

Wetlands
After the last shift of the Waikato River back to the west coast, the Waihou and Piako rivers were formed. These two rivers carried silt out into the Firth of Thames or Tikapa.

The plains were full of mangroves, raupo (Typha orientalis), harakeke (Phormium tenax) a dense forest of kahikatea. Most of the land was raw peat, varying in depth from a metre to more than twenty metres. It was a morass, the home of wild ducks and eels. Nevertheless, the rich flora and fauna of the plains amply provided the staples of the Māori people who lived in the region. Many areas on the banks of the Waihou River were settled by Hauraki Māori, such as Oruarangi pā and Paterangi pā near Matatoki, and the Te Raupa pā and Waiwhau pā near Paeroa.

The early European colonists were attracted not necessarily by the land but by the dense forest of kahikatea. The colonists, or Pakeha, were timber millers such as the George and Martha Bagnall family who settled at Turua in 1875. As the kahikatea was felled, farmers followed onto the newly cleared land. But, once a year the Waihou and Piako Rivers would overflow, making agricultural settlement of the area difficult because of the poor drainage. The people who lived around Hauraki wanted permission from the Government to drain the land but the Government said it could never be done, as parts of the Hauraki Plains were two meters below sea level. However, in 1908 an act was passed to give the people permission to drain the land. The Government paid the workers to dig the drains, a process that took ten years to complete.

First land ballots 
Ballots were held for the blocks, which attracted the interests of future settlers and businessmen in the Thames Valley. Miners in the South Island were keen to settle in the area if sections were drawn up by the Government. The first applications for land blocks were made at the Miner's Union Hall in Thames on 18 May 1910. Prices ranged from $10–$15 an acre, depending on how much land was being bought and the location of the block. Some of the most sought-after blocks had up to 99 applicants.

Drainage systems
Work started immediately after the passing of the Hauraki Plains Act. Controlling the flooding of the Piako River which overflowed at least once a year was crucial. This was achieved through the construction of stop-banks to prevent flood and tidal overflow.
Farmers were required to dig drains, ranging from one to two metres wide, through their land. These drains connected to the main drains, which brought the water out and into the canals. Floodgates were installed to prevent the ingress of water into the canals, while allowing floodwaters to flow out of the system. As a result of the drainage system, the size of the wetlands declined to less than 25% of their original area.

Once the land was mostly drained, scrub, logs and tree stumps had to be cleared, and the earth leveled, to convert it to pasture. The scrub and waste was burnt off.

River transport
River transport was the most effective method to transport goods, people and animals to the Hauraki Plains, as an effective roading system had not yet been established.

Ship traffic
Ships of all sizes plied the rivers of the Hauraki Plains, from tiny row boats to huge barques although, most of the boats were steamers and the engines were made at A & G Price in Thames.

As industries progressed (like the mining in Waihi) bigger ships were required to carry the bigger loads. The majority of the boats were steamers, but some were paddle steamers. Larger passenger ships had luxurious lounges for men and women decorated with velvet upholstery and paintings on the walls. There were even brass bands on some boats and room for dancing on the decks. There was also room for horses and general cargo. Some cargo boats and punts were designed with drop sides to assist in loading and unloading on the river banks. This was especially useful when animals were being loaded.

During the mining strike the hotels were closed by the government but you could still drink on a moving boat. So people would get on the boats and take a trip for the day just to use the bar.

In 1877 massive timber ships called barques travelled up to Bagnalls' mill in Turua to collect the kahikatea logs and transport them to Auckland and Australia. You can still see the remains of the wharf where the ships berthed. When the Bagnalls first arrived in Turua and wanted to go to church in Thames, they rowed to Kopu then walked the last  to Thames.

At Orchard (now called Ngatea), Pipiroa, Kopu and Paeroa there were punts (floating platforms) that carried people, horses and carts across the rivers for a small fee. At Te Aroha, there was a wire rope stretched across the river which originally had a Māori canoe tied to it on which people could pull themselves across and was later replaced by a punt with a crank and for two shillings people could crank themselves across.

River systems
Geologists have shown that a very long time ago the Waikato river came through the Hinurea valley and filled the Hauraki Basin with pumice, mud, drift wood and gravel to a depth of over 1200 ft. You can still see evidence of sea beaches between Shelly Beach and Maukoro.

Before the arrival of the European settlers the Hauraki Plains was 400 km2 of peat and swamp land which acted as a big ponding area, through which ran two main rivers – the Waihou and Piako.

Māori used the rivers for hundreds of years to get to the rich food resources in the swamp. When the Europeans came they also used the rivers for transport. Because the Hauraki Plains were swamp land and there were no roads the easiest way to transport people, supplies, food and produce was by boat.

Gold brought many ships up the Waihou and Ohinimuri rivers with heavy machinery and miners aboard. There was even a special hard wharf built at Paeroa for fear of a conventional one collapsing while the machines were unloaded.

Bagnells' mill at Turua was established to mill the tall kahikatea trees growing there. Huge barques (sailing ships) came up the river on flood tides to collect the wood, some of which would be taken to Australia and be made into butter boxes.

After the scrub and kahikatea had been cleared farming was taken up and the farmers needed everything from food to animals and boats and the rivers carried it all in.

In pioneer days the rivers were the lifelines of the Hauraki Plains, but as roads improved and bridges were built the need for river transport diminished. Today it has all died away except the ferry that goes up the Waihou to Paeroa from Auckland, and the metal barge that comes into Kopu to pick up a load.

Waihou River
In 1769 Captain James Cook travelled up the Waihou River to look at the "lofty trees which adorn its banks". He was the first European to travel up the river. The Waihou reminded him of the River Thames in London so he named it the River Thames. Although this name stuck for quite some time, now it is known as the Waihou. His discovery of the kahikatea tree later brought many ships to the area looking for masts and spars.

In the 1900s the Waihou was navigable right up to Matamata, because development had not yet silted up the river. Travelling up stream you would pass Kopu on the left then Turua on the right, Matatoki, Puriri, Hikutaia, Paeroa and Te Aroha on the left and eventually Matamata on the right.

Piako River
The Piako River is much smaller than the Waihou, but it was just as important in the development of the Hauraki Plains. Travelling up the Piako you would see Pipiroa, then Ngatea, both on the right, followed by Kerepehi, and the last town accessible by boat was Patetonga.

Supplies were brought up the Piako by a small yacht and later by a launch. The boat was the main outlet to civilisation for the settlers who were mostly male bachelors and it was easier for them to eat stale bread brought up by the boat weekly than to make it themselves. It also brought mail and took cream back to Kopu which took four hours.

The rivers were a major lifeline for the plains in the early days and they are still a part of everyday life, though not nearly as much as they used to be.

Industries

Dairy farming
Dairy farming is the most important industry on the Hauraki Plains, providing the most income for the region. The sizes of dairy farms range from around 100 cows to over 500. 66% of the total land area of the plains is used in dairy farming. This equates to 779.34 km2 of land.

Other farming
Although dairy farming is the main industry it is not the only farming industry. Sheep and dry stock farming are beginning to catch on with farmers. There is still the demand for wool and meat, which the Hauraki Plains region helps to provide. An ostrich farm has been developed near Turua which deals in tourism, meat sales and gifts.

Education
There are primary schools in Ngatea, Kaihere, Pipiroa, Waitakaruru and Turua.

Secondary education options include Hauraki Plains College in Ngatea, Paeroa College, and Thames High School.

Wetlands conservation
In the 1840s an estimated 1100 km2 of wetland covered the lower Waikato area and Hauraki Plains. Since then 85 to 90% of New Zealand wetlands have been lost. The Department of Conservation (DOC) estimates of wetlands that remain in the Waikato are around 320 km2, approximately 25% of their original area. This figure includes Whangamarino (5,130.35 hectares), and Kopuatai Peat Dome (9,238.44 hectares). Roughly 80% of New Zealand's remaining wetlands are in areas across the Waikato region, mostly within the Waikato, Matamata-Piako and Hauraki Districts. Five of New Zealand's wetlands are listed on the International Convention on Wetlands of International Importance (Ramsar sites); there are three of them in the Waikato Region:
Kopuatai Peat Dome
Whangamarino Wetland
Firth of Thames estuary

Kopuatai Peat Dome 

At 9,238.44 hectares, the Kopuatai Peat Dome is New Zealand's largest unaltered restiad peat bog, and is also globally unique. The area is protected by the Wetland Management Reserve under the Conservation Act 1987 and is managed by the Department of Conservation.

Fifty four species of birds have been recorded in the Kopuatai Peat Dome. Twenty seven are protected, 17 are unprotected and 10 are game birds. The endangered Australasian bittern (Botaurus poiciloptilus) is found in the wetland with other endangered birds such as the banded rail (Rallus philipensis assimillis), marsh crake (Porzana pusilla affinis) and the North Island fernbird (Bowdleria punctata vealeae).

References

Further reading
 Tye, RE, Hauraki Plains Story, Thames Valley News Ltd, Paeroa, 1974
 McDonald, Elsie, Western Hauraki Plains – Its History, photocopy of handwritten book held by Hauraki Plains Library; see: https://natlib.govt.nz/records/35331417
 Sullivan, Captain William, "Kotuku" Log Book, handwritten, 1877
 Hatvany, M, "Environmental Failure, Success and Sustainable Development: The Hauraki Plains Wetlands Through Four Generations of New Zealanders," Environment and History, 14 (2008): 469–95.
 Historical Maritime Park, Paeroa

External links
 The Gulf and Its Catchment, Auckland Regional Council.

Landforms of Waikato
Hauraki District
Rifts and grabens
Plains of New Zealand
Firth of Thames
Waikato River